Upson County is a county located in the west central Piedmont portion of the U.S. state of Georgia. As of the 2020 census, the population was 27,700. The county seat is Thomaston. The county was created on December 15, 1824.

Upson County comprises the Thomaston, GA Micropolitan Statistical Area, which is also included in the Atlanta-Athens-Clarke County-Sandy Springs, GA Combined Statistical Area.

History
Upson County was formed in 1824 and named after Stephen Upson, a state legislator.

Geography
Upson County boasts the lowest average summer humidity in the state.

The vast majority of Upson County is located in the Upper Flint River sub-basin of the ACF River Basin (Apalachicola-Chattahoochee-Flint River Basin), with just a tiny northeastern corner of the county, north of Yatesville, located in the Upper Ocmulgee River sub-basin of the Altamaha River basin.

Major highways
  U.S. Route 19
  U.S. Route 80
  State Route 3
  State Route 22
  State Route 36
  State Route 74
  State Route 74 Alternate

Adjacent counties
 Lamar County - north
 Pike County - north
 Monroe County - northeast
 Crawford County - southeast
 Taylor County - south
 Talbot County - southwest
 Meriwether County - northwest

Demographics

2020 census

As of the 2020 United States census, there were 27,700 people, 10,154 households, and 6,100 families residing in the county.

2010 census
As of the 2010 United States Census, there were 27,153 people, 10,716 households, and 7,382 families living in the county. The racial makeup of the county was 68.8% white, 28.0% black or African American, 0.5% Asian, 0.3% American Indian, 1.2% from other races, and 1.2% from two or more races. Those of Hispanic or Latino origin made up 2.2% of the population. In terms of ancestry, 21.4% were American, 13.1% were Irish, 9.3% were English, and 6.3% were German.

Of the 10,716 households, 32.8% had children under the age of 18 living with them, 45.8% were married couples living together, 17.6% had a female householder with no husband present, 31.1% were non-families, and 27.4% of all households were made up of individuals. The average household size was 2.49 and the average family size was 3.00. The median age was 40.3 years.

The median income for a household in the county was $34,509 and the median income for a family was $42,737. Males had a median income of $36,870 versus $27,075 for females. The per capita income for the county was $17,398. About 16.7% of families and 20.1% of the population were below the poverty line, including 25.9% of those under age 18 and 9.9% of those age 65 or over.

2000 census
As of the census of 2000, there were 27,597 people, 10,722 households, and 7,687 families living in the county.  The population density was 85 people per square mile (33/km2).  There were 11,616 housing units at an average density of 36 per square mile (14/km2).  The racial makeup of the county was 70.58% White, 27.95% Black or African American, 0.25% Native American, 0.38% Asian, 0.02% Pacific Islander, 0.30% from other races, and 0.53% from two or more races.  1.18% of the population were Hispanic or Latino of any race.

There were 10,722 households, out of which 31.70% had children under the age of 18 living with them, 50.70% were married couples living together, 16.90% had a female householder with no husband present, and 28.30% were non-families. 25.20% of all households were made up of individuals, and 11.60% had someone living alone who was 65 years of age or older.  The average household size was 2.53 and the average family size was 3.01.

In the county, the population was spread out, with 25.50% under the age of 18, 8.30% from 18 to 24, 27.80% from 25 to 44, 23.50% from 45 to 64, and 14.90% who were 65 years of age or older.  The median age was 37 years. For every 100 females there were 90.40 males.  For every 100 females age 18 and over, there were 85.30 males.

The median income for a household in the county was $31,201, and the median income for a family was $37,418. Males had a median income of $30,484 versus $20,520 for females. The per capita income for the county was $17,053.  About 11.20% of families and 14.70% of the population were below the poverty line, including 21.70% of those under age 18 and 11.70% of those age 65 or over.

Communities

City
 Thomaston

Town
 Yatesville

Census-designated places
 Hannahs Mill
 Lincoln Park
 Salem
 Sunset Village

Unincorporated communities
 Atwater
 Crest
 Dog Crossing
 The Rock

Politics

Notable people
 James L. Bentley
 C.C. Crews
 Martha Hudson
 John Brown Gordon
 Coy Bowles

See also

 National Register of Historic Places listings in Upson County, Georgia
List of counties in Georgia

References

 
Georgia (U.S. state) counties
1824 establishments in Georgia (U.S. state)
Populated places established in 1824